Oliver Kreuzer (born 13 November 1965) is a German former professional footballer who played as a centre-back for Karlsruher SC, Bayern Munich and FC Basel.

Football career
Kreuzer started his career in 1985 with Karlsruher SC. He went on to make over 150 appearances for the club became something of a cult hero. In 1991, he signed for Bundesliga club FC Bayern Munich where he won the League Title in 1994 and 1997 and the UEFA Cup in 1996. He played six years in Munich, 

Kreuzer joined Basel's first team for their 1997–98 season under head coach Jörg Berger. After playing in five test games Kreuzer played his domestic league debut for his new club in the away game in the Olympique de la Pontaise on 9 July 1997 as Basel were defeated 0–3 by Lausanne-Sport. He scored his first goal for his club on 19 October in the home game in the St. Jakob Stadium against Zürich as the two teams drew 3–3.

At the end of the FC Basel 2001–02 season, Kreuzer retired from his active football career at the age of 36. Basel won the domestic double, League champions and Swiss Cup winners, in this season. Between the years 1997 and 2002 Kreuzer played a total of 212 games for Basel scoring a total of 32 goals. 136 of these games were in the Nationalliga A, 9 in the Swiss Cup, 17 were in UEFA competitions (UEFA Cup and UIC) and 50 were friendly games. He scored 21 goals in the domestic league, 1 in the Cup, 3 in the European competitions and the other seven were scored during the test games.

Honours
Bayern Munich
 Bundesliga: 1993–94, 1996–97
 UEFA Cup: 1995–96

Basel
 Nationalliga A: 2001–02
 Swiss Cup: 2001–02

References

Sources
 Die ersten 125 Jahre / 2018. Publisher: Josef Zindel im Friedrich Reinhardt Verlag, Basel. 
 Switzerland 2001–02 at RSSSF

External links
 

1965 births
Living people
German footballers
Germany under-21 international footballers
Germany youth international footballers
Association football defenders
Karlsruher SC players
FC Bayern Munich footballers
FC Basel players
Bundesliga players
2. Bundesliga players
Swiss Super League players
UEFA Cup winning players
Footballers from Mannheim
German expatriate footballers
German expatriate sportspeople in Switzerland
Expatriate footballers in Switzerland
West German footballers